Caroline Kilchenmann (born Fribourg, August 2, 1984), is a Swiss biathlete and ski mountaineer.

Kilchenmann, member of the Sci Club Hochmatt im Fang, became a member of the national biathlon team in 2007. She studies at the University of Fribourg, and lives in La Sonnaz-Cormagens.

Selected results

Biathlon 
 2001:
 2nd, 8th Europe Cup, relay 4 x 6 km, together with Céline Drezet, Dijana Grudiček and Leda Abati, Champex-Lac
 2005:
 1st, Swiss biathlon championships, individual 15 km
 2nd, Swiss biathlon championships, sprint 7.5 km
 3rd, Swiss biathlon championships, mass start 12.5 km
 2006:
 2nd, Swiss biathlon championships, sprint 7.5 km
 2nd, Swiss biathlon championships, mass start 12.5 km
 2007:
 1st, Swiss biathlon championships, sprint 7.5 km
 1st, Swiss biathlon championships, pursuit 10 km

Skimountaineering 
 2011:
 10th, Pierra Menta, together with Valérie Berthod-Pellissier
 2012:
 1st, Trophée des Gastlosen, together with Cécile Pasche

References

External links 
 
 

1984 births
Living people
Swiss female biathletes
Swiss female ski mountaineers
People from Fribourg
Sportspeople from the canton of Fribourg